José Luis Morales Nogales (born 23 July 1987) is a Spanish professional footballer who plays as a winger or forward for La Liga club Villarreal.

A late bloomer, he only reached La Liga at the age of 27, with Levante, and spent most of his career with the club while appearing in 311 competitive matches and scoring 69 goals. He also won the 2016–17 Segunda División.

Club career

Early career
Born in Madrid, Morales only played amateur football well into his 20s. At 10 or 11 years of age, he had unsuccessful trials with Real Madrid. An ADC Brunete youth graduate, he made his senior debut in the Tercera División with AD Parla.

Morales signed with CF Fuenlabrada also in the fourth division – and the Community of Madrid – in 2010. He scored a career-best 20 goals in his only season, in an eighth-place finish.

Levante
On 1 July 2011, Morales joined Levante UD, being assigned to the reserves in the fourth tier and promoting in his first season, with the player contributing 14 goals in 41 matches. On 17 April 2013, he agreed to a new two-year deal and was promoted to the main squad.

Morales was loaned to Segunda División club SD Eibar  on 30 July 2013. He played his first game as a professional on 18 August 2013, starting in a 2–1 away win against Real Jaén.

Morales scored his first professional goal on 27 October 2013, the second in the 2–0 victory at FC Barcelona B. He added a further two in 40 competitive appearances during the campaign, helping the Basques to a first-ever promotion to La Liga.

Back to Levante, Morales made his top-flight debut on 30 August 2014, starting in a 3–0 away loss to Athletic Bilbao. He scored his first goal in the competition on 4 October, in a 3–3 draw at former side Eibar.

On 29 May 2015, Morales renewed his contract with the Valencians, signing until 2019. He scored 12 times in 2018–19, adding five assists for the 15th-placed team. 

Morales netted 13 goals in 2020–21, establishing himself as Levante's all-time scorer in the top division. He repeated the feat the following season (with seven assists), but was not able to prevent relegation.

Villarreal
On 24 June 2022, Villarreal CF announced the signing of Morales on a two-year deal. On 6 October, he scored a second-half hat-trick as a substitute in the 5–0 home win over FK Austria Wien in the group stage of the UEFA Europa Conference League.

Honours
Eibar
Segunda División: 2013–14

Levante
Segunda División: 2016–17

References

External links

1987 births
Living people
Spanish footballers
Footballers from Madrid
Association football wingers
Association football forwards
La Liga players
Segunda División players
Segunda División B players
Tercera División players
CF Fuenlabrada footballers
Atlético Levante UD players
Levante UD footballers
SD Eibar footballers
Villarreal CF players